Geng Taili (born 7 January 2000), is a Chinese footballer who plays as a forward for Guangxi Pingguo Haliao.

Club career
Born in Zhaotong, Yunnan, Geng started his career with the Kunming Football Association team, before being selected in 2013 for the Wanda Group "China's Future Football Star" initiative, to encourage the development of young Chinese players. He spent five years with Atlético Madrid, before a return to China, joining Guangzhou City in February 2019.

He joined Guangxi Pingguo Haliao in August 2020, going on to establish himself as a good finisher with the club.

International career
Geng was called up to the Chinese under-16 team in 2015.

Career statistics

Club

Notes

References

2000 births
Living people
People from Zhaotong
Footballers from Yunnan
Chinese footballers
China youth international footballers
Association football forwards
China League Two players
China League One players
Atlético Madrid footballers
Guangzhou City F.C. players
Guangxi Pingguo Haliao F.C. players
Chinese expatriate footballers
Chinese expatriate sportspeople in Spain
Expatriate footballers in Spain